Plymouth South High School, also known as Plymouth South, or PSHS, is a public high school located in Plymouth, Massachusetts, United States. Its students are residents of the town of Plymouth. Plymouth South is one of two high schools in Plymouth, the other being Plymouth North High School. Plymouth South is located near the Long Pond neighborhood of Plymouth, west of Route 3 and The Pinehills development, and also adjacent to nearby Myles Standish State Forest, which is the biggest publicly owned recreation area in the South Shore region of Massachusetts, and also one of the biggest in the state. The school colors are Black, Teal and White and the school's teams are the Panthers.

History
Plymouth South High School was opened in 1988, the same year the Plymouth-Carver School District was dissolved into the separate Carver and Plymouth school districts. Plymouth-Carver High School became Plymouth North High School after the district separation of Plymouth and Carver. Prior to its opening, Plymouth North High School (then known as Plymouth-Carver High School) had served as the sole high school for the towns of Plymouth and Carver. In the fall of 2017, a new building for the high school built behind the existing school opened replacing the old Plymouth South which was demolished in the Summer of 2017. In June 2021, Plymouth South High School was placed (along with the entire Plymouth Public Schools district) into a state program for schools or districts that disproportionately suspend nonwhite students or students with disabilities.

Athletics

Plymouth South offers a wide range of interscholastic sports at the school for all the students. The school teams are the  Panthers, and their school colors are Black, White & Teal. Plymouth South competes at the Division 1 & 2 level of competition in athletics and is a part of the Patriot League. The wrestling programs has won 11 League Championships, and has made several runs to the Division 1 State Championship since the programs inception, most recently in 2007.

The football team also won its first Atlantic Coast League Championship in 2012. They defeated the previously undefeated Nauset 13–12. This win clinched their first ever berth in the MIAA State Playoffs. In 2013, the football team once again won the ACL and made it to the State Championship game, where they lost 42-14 to Tewksbury.

In 2018, the boys hockey team won their first state championship with a 4-3 victory over Stoneham High School.

Sports offered

Fall
Cross Country
Field Hockey
Football
Golf
Boys Soccer
Girls Soccer
Volleyball
Cheerleading
Dance Team
Winter
Boys Basketball
Girls Basketball
Cheerleading
Gymnastics
Ice Hockey
Boys Swimming
Girls Swimming
Indoor Track & Field
Wrestling
Dance Team
Spring
Baseball
Softball
Boys Lacrosse
Girls Lacrosse
Boys Tennis
Girls Tennis
Outdoor Track & Field

See also
List of high schools in Massachusetts

References

External links
Official site

Educational institutions established in 1981
South High School
Buildings and structures in Plymouth, Massachusetts
Schools in Plymouth County, Massachusetts
Public high schools in Massachusetts